Limbach is a municipality in western Slovakia in Pezinok District in the Bratislava Region, under the Little Carpathians. It is particularly well known for its production of wine.

History
The town was established around 1350, when Béla IV of Hungary invited German settlers to inhabit lands. However, it is first time mentioned in 1390. The village remained predominantly German until 1945, when most of them were expelled from Slovakia to Germany and were replaced by settlers from the regions around Myjava, Stará Turá, and Bošáca.

After World War II, when the Slovaks renamed towns and villages with German names, Limbach was briefly known as Hlinik, but the German name has remained and is now again the official name of the town.

Today, Limbach is a popular location for secondary residences for rich residents of Bratislava. The expresident of Slovakia Ivan Gašparovič has a residence there.

References

External links

Official website 
https://web.archive.org/web/20070513023228/http://www.statistics.sk/mosmis/eng/run.html
Unofficial website 

Villages and municipalities in Pezinok District